Cuphodes profluens is a moth of the family Gracillariidae. It is known from Australia, India (Bihar) and Pakistan.

The larvae feed on Acacia nilotica. They probably mine the leaves of their host plant.

References

Cuphodes
Moths of Asia
Moths described in 1916